Jan Halama (born 14 July 1988, in Jablonec nad Nisou) is a retired Czech footballer.

External links 

1988 births
Living people
Czech expatriate footballers
Czech footballers
Czech Republic youth international footballers
Czech Republic under-21 international footballers
Association football midfielders
Czech First League players
1. FK Příbram players
FC Viktoria Plzeň players
FK Bohemians Prague (Střížkov) players
FC Vysočina Jihlava players
SK Dynamo České Budějovice players
Sportspeople from Jablonec nad Nisou
Czech expatriate sportspeople in Slovakia
Expatriate footballers in Slovakia